Pterophyllum is a small genus of freshwater fish from the family Cichlidae known to most aquarists as angelfish. All Pterophyllum species originate from the Amazon Basin, Orinoco Basin and various rivers in the Guiana Shield in tropical South America. The three species of Pterophyllum are unusually shaped for cichlids being greatly laterally compressed, with round bodies and elongated triangular dorsal and anal fins. This body shape allows them to hide among roots and plants, often on a vertical surface. Naturally occurring angelfish are frequently striped transversely, colouration which provides additional camouflage. Angelfish are ambush predators and prey on small fish and macroinvertebrates. All Pterophyllum species form monogamous pairs. Eggs are generally laid on a submerged log or a flattened leaf. As is the case for other cichlids, brood care is highly developed.

Pterophyllum should not be confused with marine angelfish, perciform fish found on shallow ocean reefs.

Species
The currently recognized species in this genus are:

History
The freshwater angelfish (P. scalare) was described in 1824 by F. Schultze.  Pterophyllum is derived from the Greek πτερον, pteron (fin/sail) and φυλλον, phyllon (leaf).

In 1906, J. Pellegrin described P. altum.  In 1963, P. leopoldi was described by J. P. Gosse.  Undescribed species may still exist in the Amazon Basin. New species of fish are discovered with increasing frequency, and, like P. scalare and P. leopoldi, the differences may be subtle. Scientific notations describe the P. leopoldi as having 29–35 scales in a lateral row and straight predorsal contour, whereas, P. scalare is described as having 35–45 scales in a lateral row and a notched predorsal contour. P. leopoldi shows the same coloration as P. scalare, but a faint stripe shows between the eye stripe and the first complete body stripe and a third incomplete body stripe exists between the two main (complete) body stripes that extends three-fourths the length of the body.  P. scalare's body does not show the stripe between the eye stripe and first complete body stripe at all, and the third stripe between the two main body stripes rarely extends downward more than a half inch, if even present. P. leopoldi fry develop three to eight body stripes, with all but one to five fading away as they mature, whereas P. scalare only has two in true wild form throughout life.

Angelfish were bred in captivity for at least 30 years prior to P. leopoldi being described.

In the aquarium

Angelfish are one of the most commonly kept freshwater aquarium fish, as well as the most commonly kept cichlid. They are praised for their unique shape, color, and behavior.  It was not until the late 1920s to early 1930s that the angelfish was bred in captivity in the United States.

Species 
The most commonly kept species in the aquarium is Pterophyllum scalare. Most of the individuals in the aquarium trade are captive-bred. Sometimes, captive-bred Pterophyllum altum is available. Pterophyllum leopoldi is the hardest to find in the trade.

Care 
Angelfish are kept in a warm aquarium, ideally around 80 °F (27 °C), with soft and acidic (<6.5ph) water.  Though angelfish are members of the cichlid family, they are generally peaceful when not mating; however, the general rule "big fish eat little fish" applies. Suitable tank mates include Raphael catfish which have their own armour for protection.

Breeding 

P. scalare is relatively easy to breed in the aquarium, although one of the results of generations of inbreeding is that many breeds have almost completely lost their rearing instincts, resulting in the tendency of the parents to eat their young. In addition, it is very difficult to accurately identify the sex of any individual until it is nearly ready to breed.

Angelfish pairs form long-term relationships where each individual will protect the other from threats and potential suitors. Upon the death or removal of one of the mated pair, breeders have experienced the total refusal of the remaining mate to pair up with any other angelfish and successfully breed with subsequent mates.

Depending upon aquarium conditions, P. scalare reaches sexual maturity at the age of six to 12 months or more. In situations where the eggs are removed from the aquarium immediately after spawning, the pair is capable of spawning every seven to 10 days. Around the age of three years, spawning frequency decreases and eventually ceases.

When the pair is ready to spawn, they choose an appropriate medium upon which to lay the eggs, and spend one or two days picking off detritus and algae from the surface. This medium may be a broad-leaf plant in the aquarium, a flat surface such as a piece of slate placed vertically in the aquarium, a length of pipe, or even the glass sides of the aquarium. The female deposits a line of eggs on the spawning substrate, followed by the male, which fertilizes the eggs. This process is repeated until a total of 100 to more than 1,200 eggs are laid, depending on the size and health of the female fish. As both parents care for the offspring throughout development, the pair takes turns maintaining a high rate of water circulation around the eggs by swimming very close to the eggs and fanning them with their pectoral fins. In a few days, the eggs hatch and the fry remain attached to the spawning substrate. During this period, the fry survive by consuming the remnants of their yolk sacs. At one week, the fry  detach and become free-swimming. Successful parents keep close watch on the eggs until then. At the free-swimming stage, the fry can be fed suitably sized live food.

P. altum is notably difficult to breed in an aquarium environment.

Lifespan 
Freshwater Angelfish with quality genetics are known to live approximately 12 years in captivity, if the ideal living conditions are provided. In the wild they are thought to live as long as 15 years if unthreatened by their numerous natural predators.

Compatibility with other fish 
In pet stores, the freshwater angelfish is typically placed in the semiaggressive category. Some tetras and barbs are compatible with angelfish, but ones small enough to fit in the mouth of the angelfish may be eaten. Generous portions of food should be available so the angelfish do not get hungry and turn on their tank mates.

Aquarium varieties 
Most strains of angelfish available in the fishkeeping hobby are the result of many decades of selective breeding. For the most part, the original crosses of wild angelfish were not recorded and confusion between the various species of Pterophyllum, especially P. scalare and P. leopoldi, is common. This makes the origins of "domestic angelfish" unclear. Domestic strains are most likely a collection of genes resulting from more than one species of wild angelfish, combined with the selection of mutations in domesticated lines over the last 60 or more years. The result of this is a domestic angelfish that is a true hybrid, with little more than a superficial resemblance to wild Pterophyllum species. 
Much of the research into the known genetics of P. scalare is the result of the research of Dr. Joanne Norton, who published a series of 18 articles in Freshwater and Marine Aquarium Magazine. The genome of P. scalare was first sequenced and assembled by Indeever Madireddy, a high school student in October 2022.   

Silver (+/+): The silver angelfish most commonly resembles the wild form of angelfish, and is also referred to as "wild-type". It is not, however, caught in the wild and is considered domestic. The fish has a silver body with red eyes, and three vertical black stripes that can fade or darken depending on the mood of the fish.
Gold (g/g): The genetic trait for the gold angelfish is recessive, and causes a light golden body with a darker yellow or orange color on the crown of the fish. It does not have the vertical black stripes or the red eye seen in the wild angelfish.
Zebra (Z/+ or Z/Z): The zebra phenotype results in four to six vertical stripes on the fish that in other ways resembles a silver angelfish. It is a dominant mutation that exists at the same locus as the stripeless gene.
Black lace (D/+) or zebra lace (D/+ - Z/+): A silver or zebra with one copy of the dark gene results in very attractive lacing in the fins, considered by some to the most attractive of all angelfish varieties.
Smokey (Sm/+): A variety with a dark brownish grey back half and dark dorsal and anal fins
Chocolate (Sm/Sm): Homozygous for smokey with more of the dark pattern, sometimes only the head is silver

Halfblack (h/h): Silver with a black rear portion, halfblack can express along with some other color genes, but not all. The pattern may not develop or express if the fish are in stressful conditions. 
 

Sunset blushing (g/g S/S): The sunset blushing has two genes of gold and two genes of stripeless. The upper half of the fish exhibits orange on the best specimens. The body is mostly white in color, and the fins are clear. The amount of orange showing on the fish can vary. On some, the body is a pinkish or tangerine color. The term blushing comes from the clear gill plates found on juveniles, with pinkish gills underneath.

Koi (Gm/Gm S/S) or (Gm/g S/S): The koi has a double or single gene of gold marble with a double gene of stripeless. Their expression of orange varies with stress levels. The black marbling varies from 5%-40% coverage.
Leopard (Sm/Sm Z/Z) or (Sm/Sm Z/+): Leopards are very popular fish when young, having spots over most of their bodies. Most of these spots grow closer together as adults, so they look like chocolates with dots. 
Blue blushing (S/S): This wild-type angelfish has two stripeless genes. The body is actually grey with a bluish tint under the right light spectrum. An iridescent pigment develops as they age. This iridescence usually appears blue under most lighting.
Silver gold marble (Gm/+): A silver angel with a single gold marble gene, this is a co-dominant expression.
Ghost (S/+): Heterozygous for stripeless results in a mostly silver fish with just a stripe through the eye and tail. Sometimes, portions of the body stripes will express.
Gold marble (Gm/g or Gm/Gm)'''
Depending on whether the Gold Marble is single or double dose, the marbling will range from 5% to 40% coverage.

Marble (M/+ or M/M or M/g or M/Gm): Marble expresses with much more black pattern than gold marble. The marbling varies from 50% to 95%.
Black hybrid (D/g or D/Gm): A cross of black with a gold, the result is black hybrids, a very vigorous black that may look brassy when young. This cross does not breed true.

Pearlscale (p/p): Pearlscale is a scale mutation, also called the "diamond" angelfish in some regions due to the gem-like iridescence on its scales. The scales have a wrinkled, wavy look that reflects light to create a sparkling effect. Pearl develops slowly, starting at around 9 weeks of age. In can be inhibited by stressful conditions. It is recessive, requiring both parents to contribute the allele. 
Black ghost (D/+ - S/+): Similar to a ghost, it has a darker appearance due to the dark gene, and very similar to a black lace without complete stripes. Ghosts generally have more iridescence than normal.
Albino (a/a): Albino removes dark pigments in most varieties. Some, like albino marble still have a little black remaining on a percentage of the fish. The eye pupils are pink as in all albino animals. The surrounding iris can be red or yellow depending on the variety.

References

External links 

 
Heroini
Cichlid genera
Taxa named by Johann Jakob Heckel